Arron Fray (born 1 May 1987) is a footballer who plays as a defender for Glebe.

Fray was born in Bromley and came through the Crystal Palace academy, making a surprise debut for the club against Italian club Internazionale in July 2005, playing on the opposite side of defence to his natural position of right-back. During the 2005–06 season, he played two matches in the Football League Cup for Crystal Palace, against Walsall and Coventry City. Fray was released by Palace in 2008 without making a league appearance and he subsequently signed for Dagenham & Redbridge. Fray did not make a league appearance for them either, and was released in 2009. Fray then signed for non-league club Bromley. In 2011, Fray signed for Thurrock. He subsequently signed for Erith and Belvedere of the Southern Counties East Football League.  Fray was playing for Glebe in the Southern Counties East Football League.

References

External links
Arron Fray player profile at cpfc.co.uk

Fray at holmesdale.net

1987 births
Living people
Association football defenders
English footballers
Crystal Palace F.C. players
Dagenham & Redbridge F.C. players
Bromley F.C. players
Thurrock F.C. players
Erith & Belvedere F.C. players
Glebe F.C. players